The Japanese marten (Martes melampus) is a marten species endemic to Japan.

Description
Males are generally larger than females. The pelage varies in color from dark brown to dull yellow with a cream-colored throat.

Diet and behavior
Both males and females are territorial, and the size of each individual's territory depending on food availability. The Japanese marten is omnivorous, preferring meat from fish, frogs, and small birds and mammals, but consuming insects, fruit, and seeds when necessary.

Taxonomy
The two confirmed subspecies of Japanese marten are:

 M. m. melampus lives on several of the Japanese islands.
 M. m. tsuensis is endemic to Tsushima Island.

It is most closely related to the sable (M. zibellina), with which it is sympatric on Hokkaido.

Distribution
The Japanese marten's presence on Hokkaido and Sado islands are due to introductions. It has been recorded in South Korea, but no locality details prove a wild origin and no native population has been confirmed.

Reproduction and lifecycle
The Japanese martens' breeding season occurs between March and the middle of May.  They usually produce one offspring; however, they can have up to five kits per mating season.  The offspring are born blind and deaf.  As a mammal, the female produces milk for her young offspring, but by 3–4 months of age, the kits are able to hunt and soon leave their mother.  Sexual maturity occurs between 1 and 2 years old.  Average lifespan in the wild is unknown, although a specimen in captivity lived for a little more than 12 years.

After reaching maturity, young martens often try to establish their territory.  They mark their territory with scent marking.

Habitat
Japanese martens live in boreal forests in much of Japan's mainland. In the winter, martens tend to go to the forests where they can get the most prey.  They tend to choose well-established forests because of the ways the creatures have specialized and due to their long lifespan.  As such,  martens likely are valuable in assessing the health of the forest.  However, in the summer, their habitat and diet become much more generalized, allowing them to live in a much more varied environment.

Ecology

One of the biggest roles martens play in the environment is seed dispersal.  Many fleshy fruits rely on birds and bats to disperse their seeds; however, in more northern climates, the numbers of these species decrease.  With the decrease of these species also comes a decrease in seed dispersal.  In these areas, carnivores with omnivorous diets, like the Japanese marten, can become the vector of dispersal.  These carnivores prove to be good dispersal mechanisms because they often have large home ranges leading to dispersal farther from the parent.  Furthermore, since the carnivores are usually larger than birds or bats, the can carry and disperse larger seeds.  Around 62% of the Japanese martens' feces contained one or more seeds.

Effects on humans
Japanese martens have both positive and negative impacts on human activities in their habitats.  As a positive, the martens prey on Japanese hares (Lepus brachyurus), which lower the quality of trees by their browsing.  However, their prey also can include many insects which aid agriculture.

Threats and conservation efforts
The biggest threat to the Japanese marten is the logging industry, which targets its preferred habitat of well-established forests.  The industry often clear cuts forests quickly destroying the creatures habitat without allowing it to recover.  This practice also causes insularization of marten populations, in turn causing changes in foraging behaviors and the decrease of the genetic pool.  Furthermore, pine plantations in their ecosystems do not contain important food for the martens.

Steps have been taken to try to conserve the martens.  The most common are regulations on trapping. The species has been named as a Natural Monument Species in Japan in 1971, calling for attention to the species' vulnerability.  The species also has been given legal protection on the Tsushima Islands.

Legends

In the Iga region, Mie Prefecture, is the saying, "the fox has seven disguises, the tanuki has eight, and the marten has nine," and  a legend relates how the marten has greater ability in shapeshifting than the fox (kitsune) or tanuki. In the Akita Prefecture and the Ishikawa Prefecture, if a marten crosses in front of someone, it is said to be an omen for bad luck (the weasel has the same kind of legend), and in the Hiroshima Prefecture,  if one kills a marten, one is said to soon encounter a fire. In the Fukushima Prefecture, they are also called heko, fuchikari, komono, and haya, and they are said to be those who have died in avalanches in disguise.

In the collection of yōkai depictions, the Gazu Hyakki Yagyō by Sekien Toriyama, they were depicted under the title "鼬", but this was read not as "itachi" but rather "ten", and "ten" are weasels that have reached several years of age and became yōkai that have acquired supernatural powers. In the depiction, several martens have gathered together above a ladder and created a column of fire, and one fear about them was that if martens that have gathered together in this form appear next to a house, the house would catch on fire.

References

Further reading
 Japanese Marten on Animal Diversity
 Nowak, Ronald M. (2005). Walker's Carnivores of the World. Baltimore: Johns Hopkins Press. 

Martens
Endemic mammals of Japan
Mammals described in 1841